Daniel Gomez (born 16 March 1979 in Thionville, Moselle) is a French retired footballer.

Playing career
Gomez began his footballing career in his native France with FC Metz, and had stints in Belgium, Germany, Cyprus and finally Luxembourg. He last played for Luxembourg National Division side F91 Dudelange in the 2012–13 season.

Honours
 DFB-Pokal finalist: 2003–04

References

1979 births
Living people
People from Thionville
French footballers
French people of Spanish descent
Doping cases in association football
French sportspeople in doping cases
FC Metz players
Alemannia Aachen players
FC Energie Cottbus players
MVV Maastricht players
R.E. Virton players
Doxa Katokopias FC players
Jeunesse Esch players
F91 Dudelange players
Ligue 2 players
Eerste Divisie players
2. Bundesliga players
Cypriot First Division players
French expatriate footballers
Expatriate footballers in Germany
Expatriate footballers in the Netherlands
Expatriate footballers in Cyprus
Expatriate footballers in Belgium
Expatriate footballers in Luxembourg
Association football forwards
Sportspeople from Moselle (department)
Footballers from Grand Est
French expatriate sportspeople in the Netherlands
French expatriate sportspeople in Cyprus
French expatriate sportspeople in Luxembourg
French expatriate sportspeople in Belgium
French expatriate sportspeople in Germany